Astaprahari or Ashtaprahari a Hindu ritual function performed for 8 praharas  collectively in devotional praise of Lord Krishna. Devotees chanting name of the Lord (including; Hare Krishna Hare Krishna Prabhu Nityananda, Hare Rama Hare Rama Shriradhe Govinda) continuously for twenty-four hours in turn without any break in a specified place on specified days with specified instruments. This is mainly performed in the Indian states of Odisha and West Bengal.

Description of the preparations
Before starting to this event, the entrance courtyard in front of the house where the function should take place is cleaned and decorated. The roof is temporarily covered mostly by bamboo long-sticks, coconut leaves and boughs or by clothes for protecting from dust, heat and runways. The soil of the yard is washed and mopped by sacred cows dung water and left to dry up. Coloured flags, coloured papers of different style and design are cut for decorations. The poles bars and the stage are decorated with much coloured papers.
At the center of the courtyard , a stage (Mandap) under the roof is made. A coloured cotton cloth called Shamiana is spread over the centre stage as its roof. The Mandap is made by a tree or placing stools in pyramid form and are covered by white cloth. Big size framed photographs of various Gods associated with Krishna including; Krishna with Chaitanya, Jagannath, Rama, Krishna with Radha, Krishna with Balaram are placed all four sides of these stools in tier to tier.
Then flower decoration starts garlanding of each God's photo is done. Then the stage and the Mandap are decorated by flower garlands. Lighting decoration is also done in the courtyard and on the stage. An expert priest for conducting Astaprahari is invited. He arrives on the first day up to end of the function. One base group of devotees are invited form the locality to start the puja (Kalasa Buda Puja) on the first day. This day is called as Adhibasa in which puja starts after the midnight and in early morning.

Procedure and Conclusion
At morning 03:30 hrs, a group of devotees carry empty earthen pot/ pitcher(Kalas) and walk to the nearest River or Canal. They take birth and fill their Kalas with water. These Kalas are established in the center stage of Mandap. While bringing water, the priest does some worshipping and chanting. A clay lamp with ghee and cotton is lit and kept inside a big earthen cover. The body of the pot has small perforations or holes to allow oxygen for continues burning.
At about 04:30 hrs welcome puja of lord Krishna is done. Thus god's arrival on the center-stage, takes repetition. The base group of people doing this Adhibasa initiate such singing. The group in chorus always recite the scared names of Lord Krishna in form of rhythmical music along with instruments of Taber, Cymbals etc. while walking around the center stage in clock wise direction.
Devotional words of name-dropping are recited and sung in rhythm. These words are also written or painted prominently on a board by fixing at the entrance and displaying to the devotees, visitors and public. The new invited chorus group of devotees are reminded by this display to get preparing to sing and recite after joining the devotional chorus called as Sankirtan. The group leader first sings one line; others repeats and follows the rhythm. The leader after few minutes changes the rhythm. It is very attractive, devotional and full of emotions.
At least four to five groups of devotees are invited to arrive at the function and join the chorus. From day time up to evening these groups come by batches. They begin their singing parallel with the previous group among their group with instruments and slowly merge in, then the previous group stops and goes to take rest. In this manner, group after group join the chorus, thus continues rhythm of reciting god's name never stops and continues flawlessly without break and interruption.
The completion day is called Nagar Kirtan means singing devotional songs in the locality approaching every house by local group travel from, house to house singing the gods name. Then all house members offers some fruits, sweets etc. as gifts according to their interest and options. After this the group returned to Mandap.

Now the concluding ceremony of Astaprahari happens. The scared book of the Astaprahari is read with rhythm by the priest, others follow and repeats. An earthen pot with curd-water with turmeric paste is prepared; a bunch of mango leaf is kept inside. A person for whom the Astaprahari has been reserved is decorated by best mearing him with sandal paste, turmeric paste on body & forehead. A cloth is wrapped as a turban  on his head. The earthen pot with curd water cum turmeric & kept on the turban head. He walks around the stage carrying the pot on the head. Holding the pot on the head by left hand, he takes one bunch of mango leaf in right hand and dips it into the curd-water. Then he waves the bunch of leaves towards the public by throwing the sacred droplets of curd-water of the Lord over them and purifying the common mass.

At the end the priest does a great chorus of devotional and musical rhythm and thrills the ambience when he instructs all to dance remembering god in heart with deep devotion and advises to broke the earthen pot by  throwing on the ground. Immediately everyone rolls down on the moist ground of turmeric-curd-water and love to be smear the whole body. Thus the astaprahari comes to end.

References

Hindu philosophical concepts
Kirtan
Bhakti movement
Hindu practices